The 2021 North Carolina Courage season was the team's fifth season as a professional women's soccer team. North Carolina Courage plays in the National Women's Soccer League, the top tier of women's soccer in the United States.

Background 

North Carolina had finished the previous two regular seasons as champions of the National Women's Soccer League, along with winning the NWSL Shield by maintaining the league-best record in 2017, 2018, and 2019. The 2020 regular season was canceled due to the COVID-19 pandemic, and the team was eliminated in the quarter-final round of the 2020 Challenge Cup.

During the off-season, tennis star Naomi Osaka joined the team's ownership and the team unveiled new home and away kits.

Competitive matches

Challenge Cup

Group stage

Standings

Regular season

Matches 

Color key: Green = North Carolina win; Yellow = draw; Red = opponents win.

Standings

Playoffs

See also 

 2021 in association football

References 

2021 National Women's Soccer League season
American soccer clubs 2021 season
North Carolina Courage
North Carolina Courage seasons
2021 in sports in North Carolina